Psel or PSEL may refer to:
Psel (river), a tributary of the Dnieper in Russia and Ukraine
P-selectin
Printed segmented electroluminescence
Pseudaminic acid synthase, an enzyme